Togo participated at the 2018 Summer Youth Olympics in Buenos Aires, Argentina from 6 October to 18 October 2018.

Athletics

Beach volleyball

Togo had 1 team.

Fencing

Togo was given a quota to compete by the tripartite committee.

 Girls' Foil - 1 quota

References

2018 in Togolese sport
Nations at the 2018 Summer Youth Olympics
Togo at the Youth Olympics